{
  "type": "ExternalData",
  "service": "page",
  "title": "ROCEEH/Gravettian.map"
}

The Gravettian was an archaeological industry of the European Upper Paleolithic that succeeded the Aurignacian circa 33,000 years BP. It is archaeologically the last European culture many consider unified, and had mostly disappeared by  22,000 BP, close to the Last Glacial Maximum, although some elements lasted until  17,000 BP. In Spain and France, it was succeeded by the Solutrean, and developed into or continued as the Epigravettian in Italy, the Balkans, Ukraine and Russia.

The Gravettian culture is known for Venus figurines, which were typically carved from either ivory or limestone. The culture was first identified at the site of La Gravette in the southwestern French department of Dordogne.

Gravettian culture

The Gravettians were hunter-gatherers who lived in a bitterly cold period of European prehistory, and the Gravettian lifestyle was shaped by the climate. Pleniglacial environmental changes forced them to adapt. West and Central Europe were extremely cold during this period. Archaeologists usually describe two regional variants: the western Gravettian, known mainly from cave sites in France, Spain and Britain, and the eastern Gravettian in Central Europe and Russia. The eastern Gravettians, which include the Pavlovian culture, were specialized mammoth hunters, whose remains are usually found not in caves but in open air sites.

Gravettian culture thrived on their ability to hunt animals. They utilized a variety of tools and hunting strategies. Compared to theorized hunting techniques of Neanderthals and earlier human groups, Gravettian hunting culture appears much more mobile and complex. They lived in caves or semi-subterranean or rounded dwellings which were typically arranged in small "villages". Gravettians are thought to have been innovative in the development of tools such as blunted-back knives, tanged arrowheads and boomerangs. Other innovations include the use of woven nets and oil lamps made of stone. Blades and bladelets were used to make decorations and bone tools from animal remains.

Gravettian culture extends across a large geographic region, as far as Estremadura in Portugal. but is relatively homogeneous until about 27,000 BP. They developed burial rites, which included the inclusion of simple, purpose-built offerings and/or personal ornaments owned by the deceased, placed within the grave or tomb. Surviving Gravettian art includes numerous cave paintings and small, portable Venus figurines made from clay or ivory, as well as jewelry objects. The fertility deities mostly date from the early period; there are over 100 known surviving examples. They conform to a very specific physical type, with large breasts, broad hips and prominent posteriors. The statuettes tend to lack facial details, and their limbs are often broken off.

During the post glacial period, evidence of the culture begins to disappear from northern Europe but was continued in areas around the Mediterranean.

Diet
Animals were a primary food source for humans of the Gravettian period. Since Europe was extremely cold during this period, they preferred food sources high in energy and fat content. Testing comparisons among various human remains reveal that populations at higher latitudes placed greater dietary emphasis on meat. A defining trait distinguishing Gravettian people was their ease of mobility compared to their Neanderthal counterparts. Modern humans developed the technology and social organization that enabled them to migrate with their food source whereas Neanderthals were not adept at travelling, even with relatively sedentary herds.

With their ability to move with the herds, Gravettian diets incorporated a huge variety of animal prey. The main factors were the animal's age and size. For example, first year deer offered hides most suitable for clothing, while fourth year deer contained far more meat. Gravettian diet included larger animals such as mammoths, hyenas, wolves, and reindeer killed with stone or bone tools, as well as hares and foxes captured with nets. This time period is classified by the strong emphasis on meat consumption because agriculture had not been fully introduced nor utilized. In addition, the climate was not favorable to stable crop cultivation.

Coastal Gravettians were able to avail of marine protein. From remains found in Italy and Wales, carbon dating reveals that 20-30% of Gravettian diets of coastal peoples consisted of sea animals. Populations of lower latitudes relied more on shellfish and fish while higher latitudes' diets consisted of seals.

Physical type

Physical remains of people of the Gravettian have revealed that they were tall and relatively slender people.

Examinations of Gravettian skulls reveal that high cheekbones were common among them.

Hunting

Clubs, stones and sticks were the primary hunting tools during the Upper Paleolithic period. Bone, antler and ivory points have all been found at sites in France; but proper stone arrowheads and throwing spears did not appear until the Solutrean period (~20,000 Before Present). Due to the primitive tools, many animals were hunted at close range. The typical artefact of Gravettian industry, once considered diagnostic, is the small pointed blade with a straight blunt back. They are today known as the Gravette point, and were used to hunt big game. Gravettians used nets to hunt small game, and are credited with inventing the bow and arrow.

Gravettian settlers tended towards the valleys that pooled migrating prey. Examples found through discoveries in Gr. La Gala, a site in Southern Italy, show a strategic settlement based in a small valley. As the settlers became more aware of the migration patterns of animals like red deer, they learned that prey herd in valleys, thereby allowing the hunters to avoid travelling long distances for food. Specifically in Gr. La Gala, the glacial topography forced the deer to pass through the areas in the valley occupied by humans. Additional evidence of strategically positioned settlements include sites like Klithi in Greece, also placed to intercept migrating prey.

Discoveries in the Czech Republic suggest that nets were used to capture large numbers of smaller prey, thus offering a quick and consistent food supply and thus an alternative to the feast/famine pattern of large game hunters. Research suggests that although no larger net imprints have been discovered, there would be little reason for them not to be made as no further knowledge would be required for their creation. The weaving of nets was likely a communal task, relying on the work of both women and children.

Use of animal remains

Decorations and tools
The Gravettian era landscape is most closely related to the landscape of present-day Moravia. Pavlov I in southern Moravia is the most complete and complex Gravettian site to date, and a perfect model for a general understanding of Gravettian culture. In many instances, animal remains indicate both decorative and utilitarian purposes. In the case of, for example, Arctic foxes, incisors and canines were used for decoration, while their humeri and radii bones were used as tools. Similarly, the skeletons of some red foxes contain decorative incisors and canines as well as ulnas used for awls and barbs.

Some animal bones were only used to create tools. Due to their shape, the ribs, fibulas, and metapodia of horses were good for awl and barb creation. In addition, the ribs were also implemented to create different types of smoothers for pelt preparation. The shapes of hare bones are also unique, and as a result, the ulnas were commonly used as awls and barbs. Reindeer antlers, ulnas, ribs, tibias and teeth were utilised in addition to a rare documented case of a phalanx. Mammoth remnants are among the most common bone remnants of the culture, while long bones and molars are also documented. Some mammoth bones were used for decorative purposes. Wolf remains were often used for tool production and decoration.

Gallery

Genetics
Fu et al. (2016) examined the remains of fourteen Gravettians. The eight male included three samples of haplogroup CT, one of I, one IJK, one BT, one C1a2, and one sample of F. Of the fourteen samples of mtDNA, there were thirteen samples of U and one sample of M. The majority of the sample of U belonged to the U5 and U2.
Teschler et al. (2020) examined the remains of one adult male and two twin boys from a Gravettian site in Austria. All belonged to haplogroup Y-Haplogroup I. and all had the same mtDNA, U5. According to Scorrano et al. (2022), "the genome of an early European [Gravettian] individual from Kostenki 14, dated to around 37,000 years ago, demonstrated that the ancestral European gene pool was already established by that time.”

See also

 Art of the Upper Paleolithic
 Aurignacian culture
 Earth's Children series 
 Epigravettian
 Haplogroup I-M170
 Last Glacial Maximum
 List of Stone Age art
 Perigordian
 Solutrean
 Upper Paleolithic
 Venus figurines
Bayac, Dordogne commune closest to the type-site of La Gravette

Note

References

Sources

External links

 Picture Gallery of the Paleolithic (reconstructional palaeoethnology), Libor Balák at the Czech Academy of Sciences, the Institute of Archaeology in Brno, The Center for Paleolithic and Paleoethnological Research
 Cave sites in France
 20,000-year-old Gravettian stone pendant found in Piatra Neamţ, Romania

 
Upper Paleolithic cultures of Europe
Industries (archaeology)